The IAWTV Awards is an annual event hosted by the International Academy of Web Television, currently based in Los Angeles, that honors web series creators and talent in more than two dozen categories.

History 
The IAWTV Awards are hosted annually (with some exceptions) by the International Academy of Web Television (IAWTV), which was founded in 2008 and is devoted to the advancement of the arts and sciences of web television production.

Inception 
In 2010, before the IAWTV Awards existed, the IAWTV hosted the 2nd annual Streamy Awards. The poor reception of the event, and the surrounding controversy, resulted in a two-year hiatus for the Streamy Awards, and the subsequent creation of the IAWTV Awards. The two awards ceremonies are both still running, though as completely separate entities.

2011–present 
Since its inception in 2011, the IAWTV has held award ceremonies annually (with the exception of 2016, 2019 and 2020), presenting awards to web series creators and talent in more than two dozen categories, covering multiple genres. Notable IAWTV winners include Felicia Day, Julia Stiles and Milo Ventimiglia, as well as the critically acclaimed web series The Guild, Blue, Anyone But Me, Husbands, Leap Year, and Whatever, Linda.

Between 2012 and 2015, the IAWTV Awards were held in Las Vegas. After a hiatus in 2016, the 2017 and 2018 ceremonies took place in Los Angeles. A further hiatus in 2019 and 2020 (with the hiatus in 2020 attributed to the global pandemic) will end with a planned virtual ceremony for the 2021 IAWTV Awards.

Awards ceremonies 
For the full list of winners from each ceremony, visit the official IAWTV website for archives.

See also 
 Webby Awards

References

External links 
 Official IAWTV website

Web series awards
Arts organizations based in California
Television organizations in the United States
Organizations based in Los Angeles
Digital media organizations